Bubble gum is a type of chewing gum.

Bubblegum may also refer to:

Music
Bubblegum music, a type of pop music
Bubblegum (Mark Lanegan album), 2004
"Bubblegum" (B.G. & Chopper City Boyz song), 2008
"Bubblegum" (The Stunners song), 2009
Bubblegum (Clinic album), 2010
"Bubblegum" (Jason Derulo song), 2014
Bubblegum (mixtape), 2023 mixtape by Biig Piig

Other entertainment
Bubble Gum (TV series), a South Korean tvN television series
Bubble Gum (film), a 2011 Hindi film
Bubblegum (novel), 2020 novel by Adam Levin

Persons both real and fictional 

 Bubblegum (wrestler) (born 1984), ring name for British professional wrestler Phil Blitz
 Princess Bubblegum of the animated television series Adventure Time